WFTW (1260 AM) is a commercial radio station in Fort Walton Beach, Florida, serving the Emerald Coast.  It is owned by Cumulus Media and broadcasts a talk radio format.  The radio studios and offices are on Hollywood Boulevard NW in Fort Walton Beach.

By day, WFTW is powered at 2,500 watts non-directional.  But to protect other stations on 1260 AM from interference at night, WFTW reduces power at sunset to 131 watts.  The transmitter is co-located with the studios on Hollywood Boulevard NW, also used as the tower for co-owned 99.5 WKSM.

Programming
Weekdays begin on WFTW with "Emerald Coast Morning with Dan Diamond," a local news and information program.  The rest of the weekday schedule is made up of nationally syndicated conservative talk shows, mostly from the co-owned Westwood One Network.  They include Chris Plante, Dan Bongino, Ben Shapiro, Michael J. Knowles, Jim Bohannon, "Red Eye Radio," "America in the Morning" and "First Light."  Also heard from other syndicators are Sean Hannity and Dana Loesch.

Weekends feature shows on money, health, real estate, technology and guns.  Weekend programs include Kim Komando, "Meet The Press" and repeats of weekday shows.  Most hours begin with world and national news from ABC News Radio.

History of call letters
WFTW first signed on the air on   It was owned by Vacationland Broadcasting of Fort Walton Beach.  The station was originally a daytimer, required to go off the air at night.  It later got permission to operate at night at reduced power.  WFTW originally had a middle of the road format of popular music, news and sports.  It added an FM station in 1965, WFTW-FM, which today is WKSM.

On February 28, 1979, WFTW's call letters were changed to WDIS, but they were changed back to WFTW on the first day of 1981.  The call letters WFTW earlier were assigned to a station in Fort Wayne, Indiana, that began broadcasting August 10, 1947.

References

External links
NewsTalk 1260 - Official Site
 FCC History Cards for WFTW (covering WFTW / WDIS from 1951 to 1979)

News and talk radio stations in the United States
FTW
Cumulus Media radio stations
1954 establishments in Florida
Radio stations established in 1954